The University Interscholastic League (UIL) Texas High School District 4-AA is a group of Conference AA schools in West Texas that compete with each other in friendly competition in interscholastic events in Sports, Music and Fine Arts, and Academics. UIL Conference AA schools consist of Texas High Schools that have an enrollment of at least 200 students and under 430 students. Beginning with the 2012-13 school year, this district will be re-aligned to include the following schools: Brownfield HS, Coahoma HS, Colorado City HS, Denver City HS, Lamesa HS, and Stanton HS. All of the schools currently competing in District 4-AA will be re-aligned into UIL District 5-AA.

Schools
The following schools compete in UIL District 4-AA.

Alpine High School (Alpine ISD),           Enrollment: 305
Crane High School (Crane ISD),             Enrollment: 294
Kermit High School (Kermit ISD),       Enrollment: 365
 Tornillo High School (Tornillo ISD),      Enrollment: 322

Fall Sports
All schools within District 4-AA participate in the following fall sports: (* Indicates school made playoffs or advanced in competition beyond district)

Volleyball

2011–2012 Final District Rankings  (** won playoff for district position)

District Champion: Crane*

District Runner-Up: Kermit* **

3rd: Alpine*

4th: Tornillo

Cross Country

2011-2012 Final District Rankings

Boys

District Champion: Crane*

District Runner-Up: Tornillo*

3rd: Kermit*

4th: Alpine

Girls

District Champion:

District Runner Up: Kermit*

3rd:

4th:

Basketball

2011-12 Final District Rankings  (** won playoff for district position)

Boys:

District Champion: Kermit*

District Runner-Up: Tornillo*

3rd: Alpine*

4th: Crane

Girls:

District Champion: Kermit* **

District Runner-Up: Tornillo* **

3rd: Crane*

4th: Alpine

Spring Sports
All schools in District 4-AA compete in the following spring sports: (* Indicates school made playoffs or advanced in competition beyond district)

Track and Field

2010-2011 Final District Rankings 

Boys (By Points)

District Champion: Crane*      Score: 276

District Runner-Up: Kermit*    Score: 154

3rd: Alpine*                   Score: 110

4th: Tornillo,                 Score: 39

Girls: (By Points)

District Champion: Crane*      Score: 246

District Runner-Up: Kermit*    Score: 178

3rd: Alpine*                   Score: 126

4th: Tornillo,                 Score: 25

Baseball

2010-2011 Final District Rankings

District Champion: Alpine*

District Runner-Up: Tornillo*

3rd: Crane*

4th: Kermit

Softball

2010-2011 Final District Rankings

District Champion: Alpine*

District Runner-Up: Kermit*

3rd: Crane*

4th: Tornillo

Golf

2009–2010 Final District Rankings

Boys:

District Champion: Sonora*

District Runner-Up: Crane*

3rd: Kermit

4th: Reagan County

5th: Ozona

6th: Crane B

7th: Alpine

8th: Alpine B

Girls:

District Champion: Kermit*

District Runner-Up: Ozona*

3rd: Crane

4th: Alpine

5th: Reagan County

Music and Fine Arts
The Music & Fine Arts for the 2010-2011 school year results are as follows:

Band and Choir

Alpine:

Band: Marching:1, Concert: 2, Sight-Reading: 1  (Chuck Wilson: Director) 

Crane:

Band: Marching:1, Concert:1, Sight-Reading:1 Sweepstakes A  (Daniel Todd, David Cadena, and Sara Hill: Directors) 

Kermit:

Band: Marching:1, Concert:1, Sight-Reading:1 Sweepstakes A  (Tim Hickman and Russel Taylor: Directors) 
Men's Choir: Concert:2, Sight-Reading:4 (Vicki Pigmon: Director, Ann Graves: Accompanist) 
Women's Choir: Concert:3, Sight-Reading:4 (Vicki Pigmon: Director, Ann Graves: Accompanist) 
Mixed Choir: Concert:2, Sight-Reading:3 (Vicki Pigmon: Director, Ann Graves: Accompanist)

One Act Play Competition
Final District Results for 2011-12

Advancing Play: Crane High School, "Night Watch" 

Advancing Play: Kermit High School, "All in Disguise" 

Alternate Play: Alpine High School, "The Lottery" 

Participants: Tornillo High School

Academics

The schools' academic records for the 2010-11 school year are as follows:

Alpine High School: Academically Acceptable
Crane High School: Academically Acceptable
Kermit High School: Academically Acceptable
Tornillo High School: Recognized

Administration

The Administrators for the Schools are as follows:

Alpine ISD: Wayne Mitchell: Interim Superintendent,  Verl O'Bryant: HS Principal 
Crane ISD: Larry Lee: Superintendent, Carlin Grammer: HS Principal 
Kermit ISD: Bill Boyd: Superintendent, James Fish: HS Principal 
Tornillo ISD: Paul Vranish: Superintendent, Margaret Ruybe: HS Principal

References

External links
Alpine Independent School District Website
Crane Independent School District Website
Kermit Independent School District Website

School districts in Texas